Nicholas Bailey (born 1971) is a British actor.

Nicholas Bailey or Nick Bailey may also refer to:

 Nick Bailey (musician) (James Nicholas Bailey, fl. from 2005), American guitarist, songwriter and producer
 Nicholas William Bailey (born 1980), American composer and songwriter
 Nick Bailey (garden designer), British garden designer and TV presenter
 Nick Bailey, a police officer poisoned whilst investigating the poisoning of Sergei and Yulia Skripal

See also
 Nicky Bailey (born 1984), English footballer
 Nick Straker, born Nicholas Bailey, British musician active in the late 1970s and early 1980s